Bell Gardens is the musical collaboration between Kenneth James Gibson and Brian McBride. Through the music of Bell Gardens, they explore the many realms of chamber pop, folk rock, psychedelic pop, and Americana. Their first EP Hangups Need Company was released on their own imprint Failed Better in 2010. Southern Records released their first LP Full Sundown Assembly in late 2012. Rocket Girl released the band's second LP titled Slow Dawns For Lost Conclusions in October, 2014. Bell Gardens is based in Los Angeles, California.

Discography
Albums
 Slow Dawns for Lost Conclusions (Rocket Girl, 2014)
 Full Sundown Assembly (Southern Records, 2012 / Burger Records, 2013)

EPs
 Hangups Need Company (Failed Better, 2010 / Burger Records, 2012)

References

External links

Folk rock groups from California
Musical groups from Los Angeles
Musical groups established in 2009
Neo-psychedelia groups
Psychedelic pop music groups
Rocket Girl artists